Benjamin Harrison Pace (February 3, 1894 – death unknown), nicknamed "Brother", was an American Negro league catcher in 1921 and 1922.

A native of Roanoke, Virginia, Pace played two seasons in the Negro leagues. In 1921, he played for the Homestead Grays, and briefly for the Pittsburgh Keystones, then returned to Pittsburgh for the 1922 season.

References

External links
 and Baseball-Reference Black Baseball stats and Seamheads

1894 births
Year of death missing
Place of death missing
Homestead Grays players
Pittsburgh Keystones players
Baseball catchers